Giovanni Ceva (September 1, 1647 – May 13, 1734) was an Italian mathematician widely known for proving Ceva's theorem in elementary geometry. His brother, Tommaso Ceva was also a well-known poet and mathematician.

Life
Ceva received his education at a Jesuit college in Milan. Later in his life, he studied at the University of Pisa, where he subsequently became a professor. In 1686, however, he was designated as the Professor of Mathematics at the University of Mantua and worked there for the rest of his life.

Work

Ceva studied geometry for most of his long life. In 1678, he published a now famous theorem on synthetic geometry in a triangle called Ceva's Theorem. The theorem,
already known to Yusuf Al-Mu'taman ibn Hűd in 11th century, states that if three line segments are drawn from the vertices of a triangle to the opposite sides, then the three line segments are concurrent if, and only if, the product of the ratios of the newly created line segments on each side of the triangle is equal to one. He published this theorem in De lineis rectis.

Ceva also rediscovered and published Menelaus's theorem. He published Opuscula mathematica in 1682 and Geometria Motus in 1692, as well. In Geometria Motus, he anticipated the infinitesimal calculus. Finally, Ceva wrote De Re Nummeraria in 1711, which was one of the first books in mathematical economics.

Giovanni Ceva also studied applications of mechanics and statics to geometric systems. At one point, however, he incorrectly resolved that the periods of oscillation of two pendulums were in the same ratio as their lengths, but he later realized and corrected the error. Ceva also worked on hydraulics. In 1728, he published Opus hydrostaticum which discusses his work in hydraulics. In fact, he used his knowledge of hydraulics to stop a project from diverting the river Reno into the river Po.

List of works 
 
 
 Geometria Motus, 1692

See also
Cevian

References
 "Ceva, Giovanni." MacTutor History of Mathematics archive. 2006. O'Connor, John J., and Edmund F. Robertson. http://www-history.mcs.st-andrews.ac.uk/Biographies/Ceva_Giovanni.html
 "Ceva, Giovanni." Encyclopædia Britannica. 2005. Encyclopædia Britannica Online. https://www.britannica.com/biography/Giovanni-Ceva.

1647 births
1734 deaths
Scientists from Milan
17th-century Italian mathematicians
18th-century Italian mathematicians